FC Dinamo Yerevan, is a defunct Armenian football club from the capital Yerevan.

History
The club was founded in 1936 during the Soviet period, winning many titles of the Armenian SSR championship.

After a long retirement from professional football, Dinamo Yerevan was revived in 1992 to participate in the domestic competitions. However, the club was dissolved in early 2008 and is currently inactive from professional football.

League record

References

 
Defunct football clubs in Armenia
FC Dinamo Yerevan
Football clubs in Yerevan
Association football clubs established in 1936
Association football clubs established in 1992
Association football clubs disestablished in 2008
1936 establishments in Armenia
1992 establishments in Armenia
2008 disestablishments in Armenia